George Richards Burnett (23 March 1824 – 13 April 1915) was an English first-class cricketer and distiller.

Burnett was born at Streatham in March 1824. He made two appearances in first-class cricket for the Gentlemen of Kent against the Gentlemen of England at Canterbury in 1849 and Lord's in 1850. He scored 31 runs in his two matches, with a high score of 13. Burnett was a distiller based at Vauxhall by profession. Burnett died at Hove in April 1915, aged 91.

References

External links

1824 births
1915 deaths
People from Streatham
English cricketers
Gentlemen of Kent cricketers
English brewers
19th-century English businesspeople